Kalinin (Russian: Кали́нин ), or Kalinina (feminine; Кали́нина ), is a Russian surname, derived from the word kalina (калина, meaning "guelder rose"). Notable people with the surname include:

 Aleksandr Kalinin (disambiguation) – several persons
 Anatoĺ Kalinin (born 1959), Belarusian politician and diplomat
 Anhelina Kalinina (born 1997), Ukrainian tennis player
 Dmitri Kalinin (born 1980), Russian hockey player
 Ekaterina Kalinina (1882–1960), First Lady of the Soviet Union (1922–1946)
 Fedor Kalinin (1882–1920), Russian Bolshevik revolutionary and politician
 Ganna Kalinina (born 1979), Ukrainian Olympic sailor
 Irina Kalinina (born 1959), Soviet diver 
 Igor Kalinin (born 1959), Ukrainian politician
 Ihor Kalinin (born 1995), Ukrainian footballer
 Konstantin Kalinin (1889–1940), Soviet aircraft designer
 Ludmila Kalinina (born 1957), skating coach
 Mikhail Kalinin (1875–1946), Russian Bolshevik revolutionary and politician, head of state of Soviet Russia and later of the Soviet Union
 Natalia Kalinina (born 1973), Soviet gymnast
 Sergei Kalinin (disambiguation) – several persons
 Yana Kalinina (born 1994), Ukrainian footballer
 Vladislava Kalinina (born 1980), Ukrainian chess player

Russian-language surnames